TPSC may refer to:
Turning point School & college
Tanzania Public Service College
Toronto Public Space Committee
Tpsc,  a subgroup in terpene synthase N terminal domain